The Fourth Army was a Field army of the French Army, which fought during World War I and World War II.

Commanders

World War I

General Fernand de Langle de Cary (Mobilization - 11 December 1915)
General Henri Gouraud (11 December 1915 - 19 December 1916)
General Marie Émile Fayolle (19 December 1916 - 31 December 1916)
General Pierre Roques (31 December 1916 - 23 March 1917)
General François Anthoine (23 March 1917 - 15 June 1917)
General Henri Gouraud (15 June 1917 – Armistice)

World War II
General Edouard Réquin (2 September 1939 – 6 July 1940)

Further reading  
 Les armées françaises dans la Grande guerre. Vol X, p. 203–263. (online)

See also 
List of French armies in WWI

Field armies of France in World War I
04
Military units and formations of France in World War II
Military units and formations established in 1914
1914 establishments in France